Karlakórinn Heimir ("The Heimir Men's Choir") is an Icelandic choir. It was founded in Skagafjörður on 28 December 1927. Most of the founding members of the choir came from a men's choir named Bændakórinn. Karlakórinn Heimir has traveled to many countries around the world.

The choir's first conductor was Gísli Magnússon. Subsequently, Jón Björnsson was conductor for almost 40 years. Helga Rós Indriðadóttir is the current conductor.

Discography
 Karlakórinn Heimir (1977)
 Kom Söngur (1983)
 Undir Bláhimni (1991)
 Dísir Vorsins (1995)
 Fram í Heiðanna  (1998)
 Stíg Fákur Létt (2001)
 Áfram Veginn (2003)
 Heyr Himnasmiður (2005)

References

External links
 Karlakórinn Heimir (Icelandic only)

Icelandic choirs
Boys' and men's choirs
Musical groups established in 1927